Cypripedium yatabeanum, known as the spotted lady slipper or palomino lady's slipper, is a species of terrestrial orchid. It is native to Alaska (including the Aleutian Islands), to the Russian Far East (Kamchatka and the Kuril Islands), and northern Japan.

It is distinguished from the closely related Cypripedium guttatum by its yellow-green flowers and narrower, longer lip. Its habitats include mesic tundra, marsh borders, and beach dune lag.

References

Flora of Alaska
Orchids of Russia
Orchids of the United States
Orchids of Japan
yatabeanum
Plants described in 1899
Flora without expected TNC conservation status